Colin Gurden Forbes Adam CSI DL (18 December 1889 – 12 November 1982) was a British civil servant in the Indian Civil Service.

Adam was the youngest son of Sir Frank Forbes Adam, 1st Baronet.  His older brothers were General Sir Ronald Forbes Adam, 2nd Baronet GCB DSO OBE and Eric Forbes Adam CMG.  He was educated at Eton and King's College, Cambridge.  During the First World War he served as an officer with the Indian Expeditionary Force to Mesopotamia and Palestine.

In 1920 Adam married The Hon. Irene Constance Lawley, only child of  Beilby Lawley, 3rd Baron Wenlock; they had three sons and a daughter:

 Virginia Mary Forbes Adam (1922-2012), married Hugo Charteris MC.
 The Rev. Sir Stephen Timothy Beilby Forbes Adam, 4th Baronet (1923-2019)
 Desmond Francis Forbes Adam (1926-1958)
 Nigel Colin Forbes Adam (1930-2022)

Adam was appointed a Companion of the Order of the Star of India in 1924.

In 1948 Adam published Life of Lord Lloyd, a biography of George Lloyd, 1st Baron Lloyd.

Adam was a Deputy Lieutenant of Kingston-upon-Hull from 1958–1966.

References 

Companions of the Order of the Star of India
People educated at Eton College
Indian Army personnel of World War I
British Indian Army officers
Alumni of King's College, Cambridge
Deputy Lieutenants of the East Riding of Yorkshire
Younger sons of baronets
1889 births
1982 deaths
British people in colonial India